James "Jim" Cygan is an American former figure skater. He is the  1982 Nebelhorn Trophy bronze medalist, 1986 Golden Spin of Zagreb bronze medalist, and 1989 Winter Universiade silver medalist. He belonged to the Broadmoor Skating Club in Colorado Springs, Colorado.

Beginning in the 1980–81 season, Cygan was coached by Carlo Fassi. He won the national junior men's title at the 1982 U.S. Championships, two years after becoming the U.S. novice champion. He placed 5th at the 1982 World Junior Championships in Oberstdorf, West Germany.

Cygan studied medicine at Northwestern University.

Competitive highlights

References 

20th-century births
American male single skaters
Living people
Figure skaters from Colorado Springs, Colorado
Universiade medalists in figure skating
Year of birth missing (living people)
Universiade silver medalists for the United States
Competitors at the 1989 Winter Universiade